Yelena Arkadyevna Naimushina (19 November 1964 – 14 March 2017) was a Soviet gymnast.

Career
She competed at the 1980 Summer Olympics in all artistic gymnastics events and won a gold medal with the Soviet team. Individually her best achievement was fifth place in the floor exercise. She won a silver team medal at the 1979 World Artistic Gymnastics Championships.

Naimushina retired in 1981 and married Andris, a Latvian cyclist whom she met in 1980. For 15 years she lived in Latvia where she gave birth to two sons Tom and Phillip and daughter Linda-Anna. They later divorced and Naimushina returned to Russia. Between 1990 and 1993 she performed in the sports show All Stars of Dynamo managed by Mikhail Voronin. She later married a second time, to gymnastics coach Sergey Grigoryev, and moved to Tula, Russia, where they trained children. 

Naimushina died on 14 March 2017. Her former coach Valentin Shevchuk said the death was unexpected.

References

External links
Interview, in Russian. mkkras.ru
Interview, in Russian. bmsi.ru (1 November 2012)

1964 births
2017 deaths
Soviet female artistic gymnasts
Gymnasts at the 1980 Summer Olympics
Olympic gymnasts of the Soviet Union
Olympic gold medalists for the Soviet Union
Olympic medalists in gymnastics
Medalists at the 1980 Summer Olympics
Medalists at the World Artistic Gymnastics Championships
Honoured Masters of Sport of the USSR